Calen Gordon Addison (born April 11, 2000) is a Canadian professional ice hockey defenceman currently playing for the  Minnesota Wild of the National Hockey League (NHL). He was selected in the second round, 53rd overall, by the Pittsburgh Penguins in the 2018 NHL Entry Draft.

Early life
Addison was born on April 11, 2000, in Brandon, Manitoba to parents Darren and Shannon. Addison is Métis. When he was two years old, his family moved to Thompson, where he first learned to skate, before returning to Brandon when he was seven. Growing up in Brandon, he attended Kirkaldy Heights School.

Playing career
Addison played major junior hockey for the Lethbridge Hurricanes in the Western Hockey League (WHL) and was selected by the Pittsburgh Penguins in the second round, 53rd overall, in the 2018 NHL Entry Draft. He was signed by the Penguins to a three-year, entry-level contract on April 7, 2019.

During his final junior season with the Lethbridge Hurricanes, Addison was traded by the Penguins along with Alex Galchenyuk and a conditional first-round pick to the Minnesota Wild in exchange for Jason Zucker on February 10, 2020. Addison made his NHL debut on February 16, 2021, in the Wild's 4–0 loss to the Los Angeles Kings.

International play

 

Addison has represented Canada at the international level since 2017. He first joined Team Canada for the 2016 World U-17 Hockey Challenge, where he won a silver medal. Following this, he competed at the 2017 Ivan Hlinka Memorial Tournament where he tallied two goals and six points to win a gold medal.

Addison did not return to Team Canada until he was selected for the 2020 World Junior Ice Hockey Championships. He led the tournament in assists for defencemen (8) and won a gold medal.

Career statistics

Regular season and playoffs

International

Awards and honours

References

External links
 

2000 births
Living people
Canadian ice hockey defencemen
Canadian Métis people
Ice hockey people from Manitoba
Iowa Wild players
Lethbridge Hurricanes players
Métis sportspeople
Minnesota Wild players
Pittsburgh Penguins draft picks
Sportspeople from Brandon, Manitoba
Wilkes-Barre/Scranton Penguins players